Mai Bhagi  (c. 1906 – 7 July 1986) was a Pakistani folk musician, born Bhag Bhari in Mithi in Thar, Sindh.
Mai Bhagi grew up in a village in the Thar Desert. Her father was Wanhyun Fakir and mother was Khadija Maganhar. Both her parents were known singers of their region at that time.

Mai Bhagi's birth name was Bhag Bhari (which means 'a lucky person'). She was married to folk singer Hothi Fakir at the age of 16 in Islamkot Therparker. She shifted to Mithi Therparker in 1950 Permanently. Record producer Sheikh Ghulam Hussain, husband of Pakistani folk singer Abida Parveen, offered her the opportunity to record at the Radio Pakistan studios, and her records were played on the radio. She started singing on Radio Pakistan Hyderabad from 1960. Her folk song ‘Kharee neem kay neechey’ (underneath a neem tree) and 'Saman Sai Maan Ta Goli Ghulam Tohinji Dar Ji' became a super-hit among the Pakistani people and secured her stardom, her Lok Geet Song 'Murli Wari Man Mohiyo so popular in Rural area of Sindh. The government of Pakistan provided financial support for her to tour overseas, and she continued her career in music until her death in 1986. You can read complete documentary of Mai Bhagi on popular Sindhi Music Website Media Music Mania. Further Complete detailed Biography and selected best songs of Mai Bhagi listen on.

Awards and recognition
 Pride of Performance Award by the President of Pakistan in 1981
Shah Abdul Latif Bhittai Award
Sachal Sarmast Award

See also
Pathanay Khan
Tufail Niazi
Muhammad Juman
Reshma
Suraiya Multanikar

References

1920s births
1986 deaths
Punjabi singers
Sindhi music
People from Tharparkar District
Performers of Sufi music
Recipients of the Pride of Performance
Pakistani folk singers
20th-century Pakistani women singers